Matías Alejandro Mayer (born 11 March 1996) is an Argentine professional footballer who plays as a forward for Bella Vista .

Career
Mayer spent time in the youth systems of Pacífico and San Martín, prior to joining Olimpo in 2012. In 2015, Mayer was loaned to Torneo Federal B side Bella Vista. He played one match for the club before returning to Olimpo. During the 2016–17 Argentine Primera División campaign, Mayer made his professional debut during a goalless draw with former club San Martín on 3 April 2017.

In October 2020, Mayer joined Sansinena. In 2021, Mayer returned to his former club, Bella Vista.

Career statistics
.

References

External links

1996 births
Living people
People from Neuquén
Argentine footballers
Association football forwards
Argentine Primera División players
San Martín de San Juan footballers
Olimpo footballers
Club Atlético Sansinena Social y Deportivo players